Mazonia/Braidwood State Fish and Wildlife Area is an Illinois state park on  in Grundy County, Illinois, United States.

References

State parks of Illinois
Protected areas of Grundy County, Illinois
Protected areas established in 1981
1981 establishments in Illinois